Rude Awakening is Andy Irvine's second solo album, recorded in December 1990 and January 1991 at Westland and Ringsend Studios, Dublin and Frank MacNamara's Park Studio, Co. Meath, and released in 1991 on Green Linnet Records.
 
It was produced by Bill Whelan with a line-up that included Whelan himself (keyboards, percussion), Rens van der Zalm (fiddle, mandolin, guitar), Carl Geraghty (soprano saxophone), Arty McGlynn (guitars), Davy Spillane (whistle) and Fionnuala Sherry (fiddle).

Recording

This album features Irvine's tribute song to Woody Guthrie ("Never Tire of the Road"), alongside mainly self-penned material celebrating some of his many other heroes: 
WW2 Swedish diplomat "Raoul Wallenberg", 
Union organiser "James Connolly"—a traditional song for which Irvine wrote new music, 
Mexican revolutionary leader Emiliano Zapata ("Viva Zapata!"), 
Michael Dwyer ("Michael Dwyer's Escape"), 
Antarctic explorers "Douglas Mawson" and Aeneas Mackintosh ("Rude Awakening"), and
American novelist Sinclair Lewis ("The Whole Damn Thing").

The only other traditional song is "Allan McLean", for which Irvine wrote new music also.

The sleeve notes of "Love To Be With You"—a poignant song of longing—show a faded, black & white photo of Vida, the heroine of "Rainy Sundays", the song Irvine released ten years earlier on Rainy Sundays... Windy Dreams.

Track listing
All tracks composed by Andy Irvine; except where indicated
 "Never Tire of the Road" – 3:58
 "Raoul Wallenberg" – 5:15
 "James Connolly" (Traditional; with new music by Andy Irvine) – 6:38
 "Viva Zapata!" – 4:25
 "The Whole Damn Thing" – 5:40
 "Rude Awakening" – 4:15
 "Michael Dwyer's Escape" – 4:59
 "Douglas Mawson" – 6:38
 "Allan McLean" (Traditional; with new music by Andy Irvine) – 4.59
 "Love To Be With You" – 4:22

Personnel
Andy Irvine - vocals, bouzouki, harmonica
Bill Whelan - keyboards, percussion, backing vocals 
Arty McGlynn - guitar
Rens van der Zalm - fiddle, mandolin, guitar
Carl Geraghty - soprano saxophone
Fionnuala Sherry - fiddle
Davy Spillane - whistle

References

External links
Rude Awakening CD.

1991 albums
Andy Irvine (musician) albums